The Burton Coal Mine is a coal mine located in the north of Central Queensland. The mine has coal reserves amounting to 164 million tonnes of coking coal, one of the largest coal reserves in Asia and the world. The mine has an annual production capacity of 4.3 million tonnes of coal. Mining operations began 1995.

Operations at the mine were carried out by Theiss until December 2017 when a joint venture between US based Peabody Energy (10%) and Australian company New Hope Coal (90%) took over.  The mine employs about 900 people. Extraction is undertaken by a terrace mining truck and shovel operation.  Exports from the mine are sent to Asia, Europe, India and South America.

Pits
The original mining pit was exhausted in June 2005, followed by Broadmeadow and Wallanbah pits in 2009. Two more pits, Bullock Creek and Plumtree South were utilised from 2010 onwards.

Both the Broadmeadow and Wallanbah pits are being rehabilitated.

See also

Coal in Australia

References 

Coal mines in Queensland
Mines in Central Queensland
Peabody Energy